Epacris purpurascens var. onosmiflora  is a small Australian plant from the heath family. It grows on sandstone based soils in the Blue Mountains region of central eastern New South Wales.

See also Epacris purpurascens var. purpurascens.

References

purpurascens var. onosmiflora
Ericales of Australia
Flora of New South Wales